Centralbron ("The Central Bridge") is a major bridge in central Stockholm, Sweden, connecting the northern district Norrmalm to the southern Södermalm.

It is 1,200 metres long and consists of two viaducts passing over Söderström ("Southern Stream") and Riddarfjärden close to Norrström ("Northern Stream") with an interjacent elevated section traversing Riddarholmskanalen and the adjacent eastern waterfront of Riddarholmen. Centralbron has a capacity for 130,000 cars per day. It is paralleled by the bridges (Södra and Norra järnvägsbron) and the tunnel of a two-track railway used by the commuter and freight trains. Centralbron does partly go on top of the Metro which opened on this stretch 1957 and planned together with the bridge.

Over the years, Centralbron together with a suggested additional railway track have been much criticized and debated because of their unwieldy and rumbling presence in a delicate historical setting. Lately, the construction of a tunnel to replace them has been suggested. The cost of such a tunnel, several billion kronor, has put this on hold without any time set. A new metro tunnel has also been suggested because the metro goes below and parallel to Centralbron, making it a total of seven rail tracks and six road lanes crossing the water south of Gamla Stan on bridges. A new railway tunnel costing 15 billion kronor (Citybanan) was finished in 2017 but the existing railway was kept. The older railway is currently being upgraded during eight weeks each summer until 2020.

Nearby bridges include Riddarholmsbron, Vasabron, Strömsborgsbron, and Hebbes Bro.

Background 
Since the first decade of the 20th century, numerous proposals labelled "Centralbron" had been produced and more than 20 of them scrapped before the elaboration of the general plan of 1928. During the 1930s the need for a "central bridge" crossing Gamla stan, the old city, declined due to the realization of the plans for a western traffic route, Västerbron, and the clover-shaped traffic junction at Slussen, both finally inaugurated in 1935.

In 1930 plans for a Centralbron was therefore substituted by a temporary solution, by its customers dubbed Slingerbultsleden ("The Dodge Route"), criss-crossing the western streets of Gamla stan using two temporary bridges crossing Riddarholmskanalen to open out on Vasabron. While the metro system and Centralbron were being constructed Slingerbultsleden had to be scrapped, and in 1953 it was substituted by a  pontoon bridge connecting the northern end of the now non-existent Riddarholmskajen ("Quay of Riddarholmen") to Klara strand. Its 7 metres wide roadway had a maximum capacity of 20,000 cars per day and remained in use until the completion of the northern bridge in 1967.

The southern bridge 

WW2 further delayed any attempts to elaborate a permanent solution, but in 1947 a decision to build a southern bridge crossing Söderström was taken, and work finally begun in 1950. The  and  bridge stretches over six spans with a maximum span of 33.7 metres. The continuous steel girders of the roadway are resting on concrete pillars firmly anchored to the soil by numerous poles.

To the south, another two spans are stretching some 46 metres over Söder Mälarstrand ("Southern Shore of Lake Mälaren") before three smaller spans hands the roadway over to Söderledstunneln ("The Southern Route Tunnel"). To the north, the bridge is continuous with a  viaduct passing over the Gamla stan metro station, opened 1957. The viaduct is made of a concrete roadway resting on steel girders.

The entire structure was completed and inaugurated June 16, 1959 and the name 'Centralbron' made official by a naming committee that assumed a Österbron ("The Eastern Bridge") would be built, thus making Centralbron a truly 'central' bridge. An eastern route is  not a timely topic, for several reasons but particularly because of the Royal National City Park taking up most of the area east of the city, thus making such a route infeasible. There is however a Western Bridge.

The northern bridge 

The realization of the northern bridge stretching over Norrström had to be postponed until the enlargement of the traffic junction at Tegelbacken was resolved in 1961. To the north, it makes a sharp turn to the west where it extends over the railway, and connects to Klarastrandsleden. The bridge over the railway replaced a level crossing nicknamed Tegelbackseländet ("The Tegelbacken misery"), since it created long traffic jams as an effect of the 1960s traffic increase.

See also 
 List of bridges in Stockholm
 History of Stockholm

References

External links 

Bridges in Stockholm
Bridges completed in 1967
Bridges completed in 1959